Britny Fox is the debut album by the American glam metal band Britny Fox, released in 1988. The album contains the hits "Long Way to Love", "Girlschool" and the power ballad "Save the Weak".

Track listing

Personnel
Band members
 "Dizzy" Dean Davidson - lead vocals, rhythm guitar
 Michael Kelly Smith - lead guitars, backing vocals, mixing assistant
 Billy Childs - bass, backing vocals
 Johnny Dee - drums, backing vocals

Additional musicians
 David Gibbins - keyboards

Production
John Jansen - producer, engineer, mixing at Blue Jay Recording Studio, Carlisle, Massachusetts
Nelson Ayers - engineer
Chris Brown - assistant engineer
Michael Frondelli - mixing
Greg Calbi - mastering at Sterling Sound, New York

Charts

Album

Singles

Certifications

Accolades

References 

Britny Fox albums
1988 debut albums
Columbia Records albums